Terence Henry Stamp (born 22 July 1938) is an English actor. Stamp is known for his sophisticated villain roles. He was named by Empire Magazine as one of the 100 Sexiest Film Stars of All Time in 1995. He has received various accolades including a Golden Globe Award, a Cannes Film Festival Award, and a Silver Bear as well as nominations for an Academy Award and two BAFTA Awards.

After training at the Webber Douglas Academy of Dramatic Art in London, he started his acting career in 1962. He was called the "master of the brooding silence" by The Guardian. His performance in the title role of Billy Budd, his film debut, earned him an Academy Award nomination for Best Supporting Actor and a BAFTA nomination for Best Newcomer. Associated with the Swinging London scene of the 1960s – during which time he was in high-profile relationships with actress Julie Christie and supermodel Jean Shrimpton – Stamp was among the subjects photographed by David Bailey for a set titled Box of Pin-Ups. He starred opposite Christie in Far from the Madding Crowd (1967). 

He gained wider fame for his role as archvillain General Zod in Superman (1978) and Superman II (1980). For his leading role in The Adventures of Priscilla, Queen of the Desert (1994) he earned BAFTA Award and Golden Globe Award nominations. He then starred in The Limey (1999) earning an Independent Spirit Award nomination. Other films include Star Wars: Episode I – The Phantom Menace (1999), The Haunted Mansion (2003), Elektra (2005), Wanted (2008), Get Smart (2008), Yes Man (2008), Valkyrie (2008), Big Eyes (2014) and Last Night in Soho (2021).

Early life
Stamp, the eldest of five children, was born on 22 July 1938 in Stepney, London, England, the son of Ethel Esther (née Perrott; 1914–1985) and Thomas Stamp (1913–1982), who was a tugboat stoker. His early years were spent in Canal Road, Bow, in the East End, but later in his childhood the family moved to Plaistow, West Ham, Essex (now in Greater London), where he attended Plaistow County Grammar School. His father was away for long periods with the Merchant Navy and the young Stamp was mostly brought up by his mother, grandmother, and aunts. He grew up idolising actor Gary Cooper after his mother took him to see Beau Geste (1939) when he was three years old. He was also inspired by the 1950s method-trained actor James Dean.

Growing up in London during World War II Stamp endured the Blitz as a child (he would later aid Valkyrie director Bryan Singer in staging a scene where the von Stauffenbergs hide from the Allied bombings). After leaving school, Stamp worked in a variety of advertising agencies in London, working his way up to earning a reasonable salary. In the mid‑1950s, he also worked as an assistant to professional golfer Reg Knight at Wanstead Golf Club in east London. He describes this period of his life positively in his autobiography Stamp Album.

Career

Early career and rise to fame 
Stamp won a scholarship to train at the Webber Douglas Academy of Dramatic Art, then performed in various provincial repertory theatres, most notably in a national tour of Willis Hall's play The Long the Short and the Tall alongside another young cockney actor Michael Caine. Caine moved in with Stamp, and they began hanging out with Peter O'Toole in the London party scene. Stamp made his film debut in Peter Ustinov's film adaptation of Herman Melville's Billy Budd (1962). His portrayal of the title character brought him not only an Academy Award nomination but also international attention. He then appeared opposite Laurence Olivier in Term of Trial (1962).

 
Stamp collaborated with some of the most revered filmmakers. He starred in William Wyler's adaptation of John Fowles' The Collector (1965), opposite Samantha Eggar, and in Modesty Blaise (1966), for director Joseph Losey and producer Joe Janni. Stamp reunited with producer Janni for two more projects: John Schlesinger's adaptation of Thomas Hardy's Far from the Madding Crowd (1967) starring Julie Christie, and Ken Loach's first feature film Poor Cow (1967).

He was approached to play the role of James Bond when Sean Connery retired from the role, but did not receive a second call from producer Harry Saltzman because, in Stamp's opinion, "my ideas about [how the role should be portrayed] put the frighteners on Harry. I didn't get a second call from him."

Stamp then travelled to Italy to star in Federico Fellini's Toby Dammit, a 50-minute portion of the Edgar Allan Poe film adaptation Histoires extraordinaires (1968, aka Spirits of the Dead). Stamp lived in Italy for several years, during which time his film work included Pier Paolo Pasolini's Teorema (1968) opposite Silvana Mangano, and A Season in Hell (1971). Stamp was considered for the title role of Alfie (1966), but turned it down in favour of Modesty Blaise (1966).

His subsequent film credits included The Mind of Mr. Soames (1970) where he played an infantile patient, A Season in Hell (1971), Meetings with Remarkable Men (1979), and The Hit (1984), which won a Mystfest Award for Best Actor, shared with John Hurt and Tim Roth. Also in 1984, he had the opportunity to play the Devil in a cameo in The Company of Wolves. He also appeared in Link (1986), Legal Eagles (1986), The Sicilian (1987), and a cameo as Sir Larry Wildman in Wall Street (1987). He played the ranch owner, John Tunstall, in Young Guns (1988). His film Beltenebros (1992) (aka Prince of Shadows), was awarded the Silver Bear at the 42nd Berlin International Film Festival. Stamp began his fourth decade as an actor wearing some of the choicest of Tim Chappel's Academy Award-winning costumes for the comedy The Adventures of Priscilla, Queen of the Desert (1994) which co-starred Guy Pearce and Hugo Weaving.

In 1999, Stamp played a lead role in The Limey to widespread critical acclaim at the Cannes Film Festival. For his performance, Stamp received nominations for Best Male Lead at the 2000 Independent Spirit Awards and for Best British Actor at the London Film Critics' Circle (ALFS) Awards. Also in 1999, Stamp appeared in the blockbuster Star Wars Episode I: The Phantom Menace as Chancellor Finis Valorum (an experience he later described as 'boring'), followed by Bowfinger (1999) and Red Planet (2000). He also appeared in Damian Pettigrew's award-winning documentary, Fellini: I'm a Born Liar (2002), offering ideas into the mind and working methods of Italian director Federico Fellini with whom Stamp had worked in the 1960s.

Superman roles

Stamp portrayed the Kryptonian supervillain General Zod in Richard Donner's Superman (1978), in which he appeared in a scene with Marlon Brando. The film and its first sequel were originally conceived as one film, with Zod and his evil conspirators returning later in the film to challenge Superman, but the screenplay was so long that the producers elected to split it into two parts. Both parts began shooting simultaneously, but production on the sequel was halted partway through due to budget and time constraints. Stamp reappeared as General Zod in the second part, Superman II (1980), as the movie's primary villain. Donner was replaced as director on the sequel with Richard Lester, who completed the film using portions of Donner's original footage combined with newly filmed scenes. Total Film magazine ranked Stamp's portrayal of General Zod #32 on their "Top 50 Greatest Villains of All Time" list in 2007.

On the occasion of Superman's fiftieth anniversary in 1988, Stamp introduced the BBC Radio special Superman On Trial, which was produced by Dirk Maggs and starred Stuart Milligan as Superman. In 2003, Stamp returned to the Superman franchise in a new role, by portraying the voice of Clark Kent's biological father Jor-El in the WB/CW television series Smallville. He also provided the scream of Zod (being exorcised from the body of Lex Luthor) in the sixth-season premiere episode "Zod". In 2006, he appeared as Zod once again in Superman II: The Richard Donner Cut (a retooled version of the 1980 film which features footage shot by Donner, the film's original director).

Recent years
In recent years, Stamp has appeared in the films Ma femme est une actrice (My Wife Is An Actress, 2001), My Boss's Daughter (2003), Disney's The Haunted Mansion (2003), and the superhero fantasy Elektra (2005). In 2008, he appeared in the film remake of the spy comedy Get Smart; another comedy about the man who says yes to everything Yes Man, opposite Jim Carrey; with Angelina Jolie, James McAvoy and Morgan Freeman in Wanted; and with Tom Cruise in Valkyrie, based on the true story of Colonel Claus von Stauffenberg's failed attempt to assassinate Adolf Hitler.

Entering in the 2010s, Stamp appeared in The Adjustment Bureau (2011), an American romantic science fiction thriller film loosely based on the Philip K. Dick short story, "Adjustment Team", opposite Matt Damon. In 2012, Stamp appeared in the Peter Serafinowicz-directed music video for the Hot Chip song "Night & Day", portrayed a grumpy husband called Arthur in Paul Andrew Williams' Song for Marion (2012), opposite Gemma Arterton and a heist comedy The Art of the Steal (2013), with Kurt Russell, Matt Dillon and Jay Baruchel.

In 2014, Stamp appeared in Tim Burton's drama film Big Eyes, with Amy Adams and Christoph Waltz. In 2016, Stamp appeared in another Tim Burton film, Miss Peregrine's Home for Peculiar Children, where played Abe, the grandfather of the film's protagonist Jake.

Stamp's next project was Crooked House (2017), directed by Gilles Paquet-Brenner and starring Christina Hendricks, Gillian Anderson and Glenn Close. He also appears in George Mendeluk's Bitter Harvest, opposite Max Irons, Samantha Barks, Barry Pepper, and Aneurin Barnard.

Books, music videos and voice acting 
In addition to his acting career, Terence Stamp is an accomplished writer and author. He has published three volumes of his memoirs including Stamp Album (written in tribute to his late mother), a novel entitled The Night, and a cookbook co-written with Elizabeth Buxton to provide alternative recipes for those who are wheat- and lactose-intolerant. Stamp's recent projects include the video game The Elder Scrolls IV: Oblivion, where he voiced the villainous cult leader Mankar Camoran; and the films Zombie Island and These Foolish Things. Stamp voiced the Prophet of Truth in Halo 3, replacing Michael Wincott. In 2005, Stamp also narrated the BBC Four documentary Jazz Britannia, which chronicles the evolution of British jazz music.

Stamp read the book Perfect Brilliant Stillness by David Carse for SilkSoundBooks. In his introductory reading, Stamp describes his love for this book by saying, "Greater love hath no man". Stamp appeared in the music video for "At the Bottom of Everything" by Bright Eyes. Stamp appeared as the featured 'castaway' on BBC Radio's long-running Desert Island Discs in June 1987, and made a second appearance in March 2006 with a different selection of music.

In 2002 Stamp provided the narration for History of Football: The Beautiful Game, a series on all aspects of the world's most popular sport. Stamp attended every England game (including the final) at the 1966 FIFA World Cup, and in July 2016 he narrated 1966 – A Nation Remembers shown on ITV, marking the 50th anniversary of England's World Cup victory.

On 7 July 2007, Stamp gave a speech on climate change at the British leg of Live Earth in Wembley Stadium before introducing Madonna. His memoir, The Ocean Fell into the Drop, was published by Repeater Books in 2017. Stamp also narrated the BBC's The Story of Only Fools and Horses in 2017.

Personal life

In the 1960s, Stamp shared a house with actor Michael Caine in Wimpole Street, London, before and during their rise to fame. In his autobiography, What's it All About, Caine stated "I still wake up sweating in the night as I see Terence agreeing to accept my advice to take the role in Alfie".

Stamp received extensive media coverage of his romances in the 1960s with film star Julie Christie and supermodel Jean Shrimpton. He and Shrimpton were one of the most-photographed couples of Mod London. After Shrimpton ended her relationship with Stamp, he moved to India and spent time at the ashram of Krishnamurti.

Stamp's brother Chris became a rock music impresario credited with helping to bring The Who to prominence during the 1960s and co-founding Track Records.

In 1984, the band The Smiths released their third single, "What Difference Does It Make?" The single cover was a photograph taken on the set of the film The Collector (but not depicted in the film). Originally, Stamp refused permission for the still to be used, and some pressings featured lead singer Morrissey in a re-enacted scene. In the re-enactment Morrissey is holding a glass of milk, as opposed to the chloroform pad of the original. Eventually, Stamp changed his mind, and the original cover was reinstated.

On New Year's Eve 2002, Stamp married at the age of 64. His 29-year-old bride was Elizabeth O'Rourke, whom Stamp first met in the mid-1990s at a chemist's shop in Bondi, New South Wales. Of Australian and Indian-Singaporean parentage, O'Rourke was brought up in Singapore before moving to Australia in her early twenties to study pharmacology. The couple divorced on the grounds of his "unreasonable behaviour" in April 2008.

Filmography

Film

Television

Video games

Theatre

Bibliography
Memoirs and reflections
 
 
 
 
 

Fiction
 

Cooking

Awards and nominations

References

External links

 
 
 
 
 

1938 births
Living people
20th-century English male actors
21st-century English male actors
Alumni of the Webber Douglas Academy of Dramatic Art
Cannes Film Festival Award for Best Actor winners
English male film actors
English male stage actors
English male television actors
Independent Spirit Award winners
Male actors from London
New Star of the Year (Actor) Golden Globe winners
People from Stepney
Rajneesh movement
Silver Bear for Best Actor winners
Students of George Gurdjieff